Bjarnólfur "Bjarni" Lárusson (born 11 March 1976) is an Icelandic former professional footballer who played as a midfielder for Walsall and Scunthorpe United in the English Football League.

He also played for Hibernian in the Scottish Premier League, where he scored once against Kilmarnock.

References

Bjarni Lárusson profile at ksi.is

1976 births
Living people
Bjarni Larusson
Association football midfielders
Hibernian F.C. players
Walsall F.C. players
Scunthorpe United F.C. players
Scottish Football League players
English Football League players
Bjarni Larusson
Expatriate footballers in Scotland
Expatriate footballers in England
Bjarni Larusson
Bjarni Larusson